Bratz is a German surname.  Notable people with the surname include:

Jens-Halvard Bratz (1920–2005), Norwegian businessman and politician
Mike Bratz (born 1955), American retired basketball player
Emilie Bratz, better known by her maiden name Emilie da Fonseca, 19th-century Norwegian actress and opera singer

German-language surnames